Halahora de Sus is a commune in Briceni District, Moldova. It is composed of three villages: Chirilovca, Halahora de Jos and Halahora de Sus.

References

Communes of Briceni District